Zuleikha Yunus Haji is a Member of Parliament in the National Assembly of Tanzania. She occupies a special women's seat, and is a member of the ruling party – Chama Cha Mapinduzi – from Zanzibar.

References

1956 births
Living people
Chama Cha Mapinduzi politicians
Zanzibari politicians
21st-century Tanzanian women politicians